is Tendai temple of the Higashimuro district, Wakayama prefecture, Japan.  The name of temple comes from mount Potalaka. It is said to have been founded by Ragyō Shōnin, a monk from India.

In 2004, it was designated as part of a UNESCO World Heritage Site under the name Sacred Sites and Pilgrimage Routes in the Kii Mountain Range.

See also
Sacred Sites and Pilgrimage Routes in the Kii Mountain Range
Seiganto-ji

External links

Buddhist temples in Wakayama Prefecture
World Heritage Sites in Japan
Tendai temples
Kumano Sanzan